Vandever is a surname. Notable people with the surname include:

Ira Vandever (born 1980), American football player
William Vandever (1817–1893), American politician and Union Army general

See also
Vandeveer